Indian Railway Catering and Tourism Corporation (IRCTC) is an Indian public sector undertaking that provides ticketing, catering, and tourism services for the Indian Railways. It was initially wholly owned by the Government of India and operated under the administrative control of the Ministry of Railways but has been listed on the National Stock Exchange since 2019, with the Government continuing to hold majority ownership.

Establishment and ownership 
The IRCTC was established on 27 September 1999, as a public sector undertaking completely owned by the Government of India through the Indian Railways. It is the only entity that is authorised to provide certain services to the Indian Railways, including online ticketing, catering, and selling drinking water on trains and at railway stations. In May 2008, it was classed as a Miniratna public corporation, which allowed it a certain degree of financial autonomy.

The IRCTC was listed on the National Stock Exchange in 2019, following which the Government of India's holding was reduced to 87%, with the remaining shares being publicly traded. In December 2020, the Government of India divested another 20%, reducing its holding in the IRCTC to 67%.

Services

Online ticketing
It pioneered internet-based rail ticket booking through its website, as well as from mobile phones via WiFi, GPRS, or SMS. It also provides an SMS facility to check PNR status and Live Train Status as well. In addition to e-tickets, Indian Railways Catering and Tourism Corporation also offers I-tickets that are basically like regular tickets except that they are booked online and delivered by post. The ticket's PNR status is also made available. Commuters on the suburban rail can also book season tickets through the website. It has also launched a loyalty program called Shubh Yatra for frequent travelers. Through this program, passengers can avail of discounts on all tickets booked around the year by paying an upfront annual fee.

Seeking to make it easier to book e-tickets, It launched a scheme called Rolling Deposit Scheme (RDS). RDS is an e-ticket booking scheme allowing passengers to reserve seats against advance money kept with the corporation. It has also added flight and hotel booking facilities to their line of online reservation services.

On 11 August 2021, the organisation introduced a smart card system for passengers traveling through unreserved train tickets which can be bought at railway stations and can help them to avoid long queues these cards can also be recharged online.

Tatkal scheme
Under the Tatkal scheme, passengers who plan their journey at short notice can book their tickets for almost all Mail/Express trains through the Indian railway's internet portal. The booking starts at 10:00 AM daily for AC coach reservations and Non-AC timing is residual to 11.00 AM, one day before the departure of the train from the source station. Tatkal E-tickets can be booked for selected trains one day in advance excluding the date of the journey from the train originating station. It can be booked on the opening day from 10:00 AM for the AC coach and 11:00 AM for NON-AC. Passengers traveling on Tatkal tickets should carry a photo ID proof along with them to be shown to the ticket checker. Earlier this year, the website launched the Lite version which doesn't include ads, pop-ups, etc., and check PNR status.

Catering and hospitality

IRCTC introduced pantry cars inside long or medium distance trains which catered to passengers by serving freshly cooked food. IRCTC has exclusive rights for onboard catering of food on all trains operated by the Indian Railways. It also operates food plazas, Jan Aahar cafeterias and refreshment rooms at various railway stations. In 2014, IRCTC launched e-catering services which allowed passengers to order food from partner restaurants online or through phone call and have it delivered to their seats.

At major railway stations, IRCTC also manages air-conditioned waiting lounges, retiring rooms and budget hotels in partnership with private entities.

Bottled water
IRCTC also owns the bottled water brand "Rail Neer" which is sold on trains and railway stations among other places.

Tourism

Indian Railways Catering and Tourism Corporation also organises budget and deluxe package tours for domestic and foreign tourists. A popular tourism package for budget tourists covering important tourist destinations across India is called "Bharat Darshan". Luxury tourism packages are also available, that involve special luxury trains such as Buddhist Circuit Train and Maharajas' Express operations.

Train operations

IRCTC also operates several express trains as a "private player" in India. In 2020, the IRCTC began operating India's first private train, the Tejas Express, from Lucknow to New Delhi.

 Lucknow–New Delhi Tejas Express, first private train in india.
 Ahmedabad–Mumbai Central Tejas Express, second private train in india.
 Kashi Mahakal Humsafar Express, third private train in india.

Milestones
 On 19 March 2014, nearly 5,80,000 tickets booked in a day.
 On 1 April 2015, Indian Railway Catering and Tourism Corporation (IRCTC) created a new national record with 13,45,496 tickets booked in a day.
 On 2 April 2015, nearly 11,00,000 tickets booked in a day.
 In April 2015, nearly 13,40,000 tickets booked in a day.
 The inauguration of Tejas Express was on 24 May 2017 from Mumbai CST to Karmali, Goa.
 Extension of Scheme of Alternate Train Accommodation System aka VIKALP for the benefit of Waitlisted Passengers with effect from 1 April 2017 in all Mail/Express trains.
 From 3 November 2017, Service started to provide information to passengers through (SMS) regarding status of delayed trains. Initially, all Rajdhani, Shatabdi, Tejas & Gatiman Trains covered. From 15 December 2017, all Jan shatabdis, Duranto and Garib Rath trains have also been included. Now this service is available in around 250 trains.
On 4 October 2019, started operating India's first semi-private train "Tejas" between Lucknow and Delhi.
On 17 January 2020, started operating second semi-private train ''Tejas'' between Mumbai and Ahmedabad.
On 16 February 2020, Indian Prime Minister Narendra Modi inaugurated first semi-private Train ''Kashi Mahakaal'' (3rd semi-private by IRCTC) between Varanasi and Indore connecting 4 Jyotirlingas of Lord Shiva.
In 7 August 2019, IRCTC launched a payment wallet names iMudra, to provide an easy way to book railway tickets, pay, send or withdraw money.
On 31 December 2020 IRCTC launched its new upgraded  e-Ticketing Website & Mobile App for booking of online Railway Ticket.

Criticism

Passenger data and privacy concerns 
The IRCTC has been criticised for failing to maintain privacy of the data that it has collected on passengers for the purposes of bookings and travel, and there have been multiple reports of data leaks and exposures, as well as concerns that passenger information has been used by the government to send promotional content with demographic targeting.

In 2016, cyber police officials from Maharashtra reported a potential leak of personal information relating to 10 million passengers. The IRCTC denied the leak, but a committee consisting of officials from the IRCTC and Centre for Railway Information Systems (CRIS) was constituted to examine the report. IRCTC officials claimed that the reports were unfounded and that there was no leak of "sensitive" passenger data. An IRCTC official later admitted that data that IRCTC had shared with third parties, including hotel, taxi, and food delivery services, had been exposed.

In 2018, a security researcher, Avinash Jain, reported that a free travel insurance scheme offered by IRCTC, which caused users on their app to be redirected to a third party insurer, had left the information of approximately 200,000 passengers exposed for a period of two years. IRCTC discontinued the insurance scheme and fixed the vulnerability that had left this data exposed.

In October 2020, a data breach resulted in the exposure of passenger data of more than 900,000 individuals online, including names, dates of birth, mobile numbers, marital status, residence, gender and travel information. IRCTC denied the leak. In the same month, IRCTC announced that it would be sharing passenger data with other public and private corporations with whom it worked. Railway Minister Piyush Goyal publicly stated while discussing railway disinvestment that the government was exploring ways to monetise the sale of passenger data stored with IRCTC, saying "There is huge data with the company and that is not getting captured in the valuation. We are trying to see how we can utilise that." Former Railway Minister Dinesh Trivedi has criticised this, calling it a "threat to the right of privacy."

In May 2020, the IRCTC made the use of the Government of India's COVID-19 tracker app, Aarogya Setu, mandatory, amidst concerns about the safety of data stored with the app. A government official later clarified in proceedings at the Karnataka High Court that downloading the app was optional and not mandatory.

In 2020, IRCTC officials used passenger personal data that had been provided to them to book tickets, in order to email a pamphlet titled "PM Modi and his government’s special relationship with Sikhs" during the 2020–2021 Indian farmers' protests, in which they advertised the benefits of government policies to protesting Sikh farmers. More than 20 million such emails were sent without consent of the passengers between 8 December 2020 to 12 December 2020. IRCTC chief public relations officer Sidharth Singh stated that the booklet "has been sent to those with the surname ‘Singh’ and those who are from the Punjab region" However, IRCTC officials later denied that the pamphlet, which was shared in English, Hindi, and Punjabi, was selectively targeted at members of the Sikh community. IRCTC officials admitted that passenger booking data had been previously used without prior consent, for the purpose of promotional government messages.

See also

Future of rail transport in India

References

Organisations based in Delhi
Railway companies of India
Catering and food service companies of India
Indian travel websites
1999 establishments in Delhi
Indian companies established in 1999
Companies listed on the National Stock Exchange of India
Companies listed on the Bombay Stock Exchange